The Mubadala World Tennis Championship is a men's and women's singles exhibition tournament. It has been held annually since 2009 at the Abu Dhabi International Tennis Complex, Abu Dhabi, United Arab Emirates.

History
In November 2008, sponsor companies Flash and Capitala announced with IMG their partnership to create a new tennis exhibition for the beginning of the season, to take place in Abu Dhabi, United Arab Emirates (UAE). The event, first named Capitala World Tennis Championship, was conceived to promote the sport in the region, creating another world class tennis event in the Middle East alongside the Association of Tennis Professionals (ATP) and Women's Tennis Association (WTA) Dubai Tennis Championships, already taking place in the UAE, the ATP Qatar ExxonMobil Open and the WTA Qatar Total Open, taking place in Doha, Qatar, and the WTA Tour Championships, also set in Doha from 2008 to 2010. The six-player, three-day exhibition, with a winner-takes-all prize money of US$250,000, preceded by weeks of tennis-themed activities in the region, including an amateur Community Cup tournament in Abu Dhabi and Dubai, was created to take place early in the season, before the start of the actual tour events, as a warm-up exhibition for the top players, similar to the AAMI Classic in Melbourne.

The inaugural Capitala World Tennis Championship took place from January 1 to January 3, 2009, with Rafael Nadal, Roger Federer, Andy Murray, Nikolay Davydenko, Andy Roddick and James Blake taking part. Murray won the event, defeating Blake, Federer, and then-World No. 1 Nadal in the final.

As of October 2009, Federer, Nadal and Davydenko announced they would return for the 2010 edition, with Stanislas Wawrinka, David Ferrer and Robin Söderling completing the field. Nadal went one further this time, defeating compatriot Ferrer in the semi-finals and Söderling in the final without losing a set. Federer won third place with victory over Ferrer.

For the 2011 edition of the tournament, Nadal, Federer and Söderling returned with Tomáš Berdych, Jo-Wilfried Tsonga and Marcos Baghdatis completing the six-man line-up. Nadal defended the title with a hard-fought victory over Federer after they respectively beat Berdych and Söderling in the semi-finals.

The second 2011 edition (held on December 29–31, 2011) featured Nadal, Federer, Ferrer, Tsonga, Novak Djokovic and Gaël Monfils.  Djokovic won the title by beating Monfils and Federer before defeating Ferrer in the final.  In the battle for third place, Nadal triumphed over Federer.

On December 30, 2017, Jelena Ostapenko defeated Serena Williams in the first-ever women's match at the tournament.

Past finals

Men's singles

Women's singles

Records

Men's singles

References

External links
Official website

 
Tennis tournaments in the United Arab Emirates
Exhibition tennis tournaments
Hard court tennis tournaments
Recurring sporting events established in 2009
Sports competitions in Abu Dhabi